Plasmopara is a genus of Oomycota. Plasmopara species are plant pathogens, causing downy mildew on carrot, parsley, parsnip, chervil, and impatiens.

References

Further reading

External links
 

Water mould plant pathogens and diseases
Peronosporales
Water mould genera